Lipaphnaeus is an Afrotropical genus of butterflies in the family Lycaenidae. The genus was erected by Per Olof Christopher Aurivillius in 1916.

Species
Lipaphnaeus aderna (Plötz, 1880)
Lipaphnaeus eustorgia (Hulstaert, 1924)
Lipaphnaeus leonina (Sharpe, 1890)
Lipaphnaeus loxura (Rebel, 1914)

External links

Aphnaeinae
Lycaenidae genera
Taxa named by Per Olof Christopher Aurivillius